Enfield Highway is an area in the London Borough of Enfield, north London. It is roughly located in the area either side of Hertford Road (Enfield Highway) between Hoe Lane and The Ride.

Etymology
Enfield Highway is marked thus on the Ordnance Survey map of 1822, it is a settlement mainly from the eighteenth century named from the  kings highe way leading to London 1610, the highway being the Roman road Ermine Street (now the A1010 Hertford Road).

The name of the hamlet along this stretch of road was  recorded as "Cocksmiths End" in 1572 and in 1658.

Education
 Enfield College
 St Ignatius' College
 Bishop Stopford's School

Thomas Ford in his history of Enfield (1873) records the existence in Enfield Highway of  "a school for 160 boys, with a master's house, built in 1872, near the Church, under a certificated master and three pupil teachers" and a "girls' and infants' school at the Highway,for 260 children, taught by a certificated mistress, and four pupil teachers."

Library
A public library, built with the aid of a grant from the Carnegie Foundation was opened Enfield Highway  in 1910. An enlarged lending library was added to the rear of the building in 1938. The borough's travelling library (started in 1947) was originally based there.

Places of worship

St James' Church, a brick gothic Commissioners' church designed by William Conrad Lochner, was consecrated in 1831 The first Anglican place of worship to be established in Enfield in addition to the parish church, St James' was built by subscription as a chapel of ease on land given by Woodham Connop. It was consecrated on 15 October by the Bishop of London, Charles Blomfield. A district was assigned to the church on 9 December 1833. The church was licensed for marriages in 1845.

Open spaces
For King George's Field, see main article List of King George V Playing Fields (Greater London)

Durants Park was created in 1903 from the estate of the former manor house called Durrants. It was named after the family of Adam Durant from 1244. It later became the home of the Wroth and Stringer families. The gatehouse of the manor survived until 1910.

Wright's Almshouses
On the west side of the Hertford Road is a terraced row of six almshouses, with a stone tablet bearing the inscription: "These almshouses were erected and endowed by Mr. Charles Wright, of Enfield-highway, for the support of six poor widows, A.D. 1847." Wright  built the almshouses a few years before his death in 1851,  and by a deed of 1848 conveyed them to trustees,  who were given the responsibility of choosing six poor widows, aged over sixty, with an income of no more £10 a year, and not receiving parochial relief,  to occupy them.  The widows were also to receive a sum of £10 annually, and one ton of coal each winter. The almshouses form a grade II listed building.

Demography
In the 2011 census, White British was the largest ethnic group at 38%, followed by 18% Other White and 12% Black African.

Politics
Enfield Highway forms part of the Enfield North parliamentary constituency in the House of Commons.

In popular culture
Some scenes in the BBC TV movie Learners were filmed around Enfield Highway.

Transport and locale

Nearest places
 Enfield Wash
 Ponders End
 Brimsdown

Nearest railway stations
 Southbury railway station
 Brimsdown railway station

Buses
London Buses routes 121, 191, 279, 307 and night route N279 serve Hertford Road, the main road of Enfield Highway.

Notes

References

External links
A photograph of the gatehouse at Durants from the Victoria and Albert Museum https://collections.vam.ac.uk/item/O54060/photograph-national-photographic-record-and-survey/

Places in Enfield, London
Areas of London
Districts of the London Borough of Enfield